Baths Island is an island in the River Thames in England on the reach above Romney Lock, between Eton Wick and  Windsor, Berkshire.

The island is unpopulated and contains public open space. It carries the central part of Windsor Railway Bridge across the river.

See also
Islands in the River Thames

Islands of Berkshire
Islands of the River Thames